Kunga may refer to:

Kunga, a common Tibetan name
Kunga (equid), a Bronze Age hybrid of the donkey and Syrian wild ass
Kunga cake, an East African food made of midges or flies
Lagos Kunga, an American soccer player
The Kunga Group, a geologic group in British Columbia
The Kunga River, a continuation of the Pasur River in Bangladesh